Haimon Einar Harald Löfstedt (15 June 1880 – 10 June 1955) was a Swedish Latinist and classical philologist. His father, also named Einar Löfstedt, was a scholar of Greek.

He was Professor of Roman Oratory and Poetry at Lund University from 1913. Löfstedt was a member of the Swedish Academy, of the Royal Swedish Academy of Sciences, of the Göttingen Academy of Sciences, a corresponding fellow of the British Academy, and a member of the Bavarian Academy of Sciences and of the Prussian Academy of Sciences.

His daughter Ingrid Arvidsson was a noted Swedish poet.

References 

1880 births
1955 deaths
Swedish classical scholars
Swedish Latinists
Swedish philologists
Academic staff of Lund University
Members of the Swedish Academy
Members of the Royal Swedish Academy of Sciences
Corresponding Fellows of the British Academy
Members of the Bavarian Academy of Sciences
Members of the Prussian Academy of Sciences
Members of the Göttingen Academy of Sciences and Humanities